Laxmi Pariyar is a Nepali politician and a member of the House of Representatives of the federal parliament of Nepal. She was elected under the proportional representation system of the Nepali Congress. She leads the Ministry of Land Reform in the Nepali Congress shadow cabinet.

She is a member of the Nepali Congress Central Working Committee.

References

External links
Marching Ahead, A profile book of women CA members

Living people
21st-century Nepalese women politicians
21st-century Nepalese politicians
Nepali Congress politicians from Koshi Province
Place of birth missing (living people)
Nepal MPs 2017–2022
Khas people
Dalit politicians
Members of the 1st Nepalese Constituent Assembly
1977 births